Jerome Markson (born 1929) is a Canadian-born architect based in Toronto, Ontario. He is perhaps best known for his multi-family urban housing projects such as Alexandra Park Public Housing.

Life

Early life 
Above their father's street-level medical practice, Markson and his siblings were raised between two booming immigrant neighbourhoods, Kensington Market and the (no longer existent) Ward.  His parents Etta and Charles were eastern European immigrants from Lithuania and Poland respectively.

Education 
In 1948, Markson began his architectural studies at the University of Toronto along with other members of a new generation of architects who emerged after the war. He, along with the rest of his first year peers began their studies in a building which had been used as a bomb-making facility during WWII in Ajax, Ontario.

Markson also attended summer courses at the Cranbrook Academy of Art, where his design style and philosophy was greatly impacted by Eliel Saarinen, a long-time director of the school. It was here where he would also meet his soon-to-be spouse Mayta Silver.

Career 
Markson began his architecture career working in smaller positions for architects Eugene G. Faludi, James Murray, George Robb and Venchiarutti & Venchiarutti.

Practice 
In 1955, he opened his practice in post-WWII Toronto. He has worked independently under the name Jerome Markson Architect for the majority of his career, except for two occasions in which he partnered with Ernie Hodgson and Ronji Borooah from 1992-1999 and 1992-2005, respectively.

References

Wikipedia Student Program
Architecture in Canada
Canadian architects
1929 births
Living people